Acute myeloblastic leukemia without maturation is a quickly progressing disease in which too many immature white blood cells (not lymphocytes) are found in the blood and bone marrow.

It is classified as "M1" in the FAB classification.

References

External links 

 Acute myeloblastic leukemia entry in the public domain NCI Dictionary of Cancer Terms

Acute myeloid leukemia